Shammi Akhter (born Shamima Akhtar; 16 February 1957 – 16 January 2018) was a Bangladeshi playback singer. She was awarded the Bangladesh National Film Award for Best Female Playback Singer for the film Bhalobaslei Ghor Bandha Jay Na (2010).

Early life

Akhter was trained by Ustad Gaur Babu.

Career 
She recorded her first song, Nazrul Sangeet “Eki Oporoop Roop-e Maa Tomaye”, for Bangladesh Betar in 1970. She came to public attention after recording the songs “Dhaka Shohor Aisha” and “Ami Jemon Achhi Temon Robo Bou Hobona Rey” for the film Ashikkhito.

Throughout her career, she helped produce approximately three hundred film songs including “Bidesh Giya Bondhu”, “Ei Raat Dake Oi Chand Dake”, “Amar Moner Bedona Bondhu Chhara Janena”, “Amar Baul Moner Ektara”, and “Amar Naye Paar Hoite Lage Sholoana”.

Discography

Non-film songs

Personal life
Akhter married folk singer Akramul Islam in 1977. They have a son and a daughter.

Akhter died on January 16, 2018, at age 60, after a five-year battle with breast cancer.

References

External links
 

1957 births
2018 deaths
20th-century Bangladeshi women singers
20th-century Bangladeshi singers
Bangladeshi playback singers
Best Female Playback Singer National Film Award (Bangladesh) winners
Deaths from breast cancer
Place of birth missing
Deaths from cancer in Bangladesh
21st-century Bangladeshi women singers
21st-century Bangladeshi singers